The Chasing Yesterday Tour is a concert tour by Noel Gallagher's High Flying Birds to support Gallagher's 2015 album Chasing Yesterday.

Background
On 13 October 2014 Noel Gallagher took to Facebook to announce details of his second album with the High Flying Birds, dates and venues and of a supporting tour and to take part in a Question and Answer session. Originally only European concert dates were announced. Several concerts in the UK sold out very quickly, leaving many fans frustrated.

On 27 October 2014 five concerts were announced for Japan in April 2015. There were also concerts to be announced in North America to also take place in 2015.

For the 2016 North America and Europe dates, the band was joined by former Oasis tour drummer Chris Sharrock, replacing Jeremy Stacey who had left after the previous tour legs to join King Crimson.

Support acts
Black Rivers (Leg 1; United Kingdom & Ireland)
Augustines (Leg 8; Austria)
Super Furry Animals (Leg 8; United Kingdom)

Set list
This set list is representative of the performance on 9 April 2016 in Barcelona, Spain. It does not represent all concerts for the duration of the tour.

"Everybody's on the Run"
"Lock All the Doors"
"In the Heat of the Moment"
"Riverman"
"Talk Tonight"
"The Death of You and Me"
"You Know We Can't Go Back"
"Champagne Supernova"
"Ballad of the Mighty I"
"Sad Song"
"D'Yer Wanna Be a Spaceman?"
"The Mexican"
"Half the World Away"
"Listen Up"
"If I Had a Gun..."
"Digsy's Dinner"
"The Masterplan"
Encore
"Wonderwall"
"AKA... What a Life!"
"Don't Look Back in Anger"

Song statistics 
In total, the band performed 34 different songs across the tour.

Shows

Cancellations and rescheduled shows

Personnel
Noel Gallagher – lead vocals, rhythm guitar
Mike Rowe – keyboards
Russell Pritchard – bass, backing vocals
 Tim Smith – lead guitar, backing vocals
Jeremy Stacey – drums (until 30 April 2016)
Chris Sharrock – drums (from 1 July 2016)

Notes

References

External links
 noelgallagher.com

2015 concert tours
2016 concert tours
Noel Gallagher's High Flying Birds